Thomas Veronese (born 2 November 1986) is an Italian professional footballer playing for Mqabba in the Maltese BOV Challenge League.

Club career
Veronese played youth football with Venezia F.C.

He joined St. Georgen in 2012. In 2013 he signed for A.C. Mezzocorona.

It has been reported that Veronese once moved without advising his previous club, with the A.C. Trento S.C.S.D. management learning about his departure from his new club's website, A.C. Mestre. Mestre is Veronese's hometown team.

Thomas Veronese joined Mosta in 2017. Veronese was an important player for Mosta throughout season 2017–18. He showed excellent displays and was already targeted by clubs such as Gzira United F.C. half-way through the season in January 2018. He was eventually signed by Gzira United F.C. in their bid to bolster their defence prior to Europa League commitments.

Veronese debuted for Gzira in the UEFA Europa League against Andorran UE Sant Julià.

International career
Veronese has appeared for the Italy U20 C.

References

External links
 
 
 Thomas Veronese at MFA

Italian footballers
Italian expatriate footballers
Footballers from Venice
1986 births
Living people
Association football defenders
A.C. Belluno 1905 players
A.C. Trento 1921 players
F.C. Südtirol players
Bassano Virtus 55 S.T. players
A.C. Montichiari players
A.C. Mezzocorona players
A.C. Mestre players
Gżira United F.C. players
Tarxien Rainbows F.C. players
Gudja United F.C. players
Mqabba F.C. players
Mosta F.C. players
Serie C players
Serie D players
Maltese Premier League players
Italian expatriate sportspeople in Malta
Expatriate footballers in Malta